Dieter Wolf is a Swiss orienteering competitor. He received a silver medal in the relay event at the 1972 World Orienteering Championships in Jičín, together with Dieter Hulliger, Bernard Marti and Karl John.

References

Year of birth missing (living people)
Living people
Swiss orienteers
Male orienteers
Foot orienteers
World Orienteering Championships medalists
Fellows of the American Physical Society